The 2013 WNBA draft is the league's annual process for determining which teams receive the rights to negotiate with players entering the league. The draft was held on April 15, 2013 at the ESPN studios in Bristol, Connecticut at 8:00 pm EDT. The first round was shown on ESPN2 (HD), with the second and third rounds shown on ESPNU.

Draft lottery
The lottery selection to determine the order of the top four picks in the 2013 draft occurred on September 26, 2012. For the first time in league history, the lottery was televised (during SportsCenter at 6:30 pm ET).

Below were the chances for each team to get specific picks in the 2013 draft lottery, rounded to three decimal places:

Invited players
The WNBA announced on April 11, 2013 that 12 players had been invited to attend the draft. Unless indicated otherwise, all players listed are Americans who played at U.S. colleges.
Alex Bentley, Penn State
Kelsey Bone, Texas A&M
Layshia Clarendon, California
Elena Delle Donne, Delaware
Skylar Diggins, Notre Dame
Kelly Faris, Connecticut
Brittney Griner, Baylor
Tianna Hawkins, Maryland
Tayler Hill, Ohio State
Lindsey Moore, Nebraska
Ta’Shauna “Sugar” Rodgers, Georgetown
Toni Young, Oklahoma State

Transactions
February 2, 2012: The Minnesota Lynx signed-and-traded Alexis Hornbuckle to the Phoenix Mercury in exchange for a 2013 second round draft pick. 
March 14, 2012: The Chicago Sky acquired Sonja Petrovic from the San Antonio Silver Stars in exchange for a 2013 second round draft pick.
February 19, 2013: The Washington Mystics receive the seventh and 19th overall pick from the Atlanta Dream as part of the Jasmine Thomas trade. Atlanta receives the 13th overall pick.
February 27, 2013: The New York Liberty receive the seventh overall pick from the Washington Mystics as part of the Kia Vaughn trade. Washington receives the 17th overall pick.
March 1, 2013: The New York Liberty receive the 15th and 27th overall picks as part of a three-team trade. The Tulsa Shock receive the 29th overall pick.
April 15, 2013: The New York Liberty receive the 25th overall pick from the Washington Mystics as part of the Quanitra Hollingsworth trade.

Key

Draft selections

Round 1

Round 2

Round 3

Notes:

Notable undrafted players
These players were not selected in the 2013 draft but have played at least one game in the WNBA.

References

External links
2013 WNBA draft board

Women's National Basketball Association Draft
Draft